Tracy Keenan Wynn (born February 28, 1945) is an American screenwriter and producer, whose credits include The Longest Yard, The Autobiography of Miss Jane Pittman (both 1974), and The Deep (1977).

Early and personal life 
Wynn was born on February 28, 1945, in Hollywood, California. He is the son of Keenan Wynn and the grandson of Ed Wynn and Hilda Keenan; his great-grandfather was actor Frank Keenan. Wynn graduated from the University of California, Los Angeles with a bachelor's degree in fine arts.

References

External links
 

1945 births
Living people
American people of Czech-Jewish descent
American people of Romanian-Jewish descent
American screenwriters
People from Hollywood, Los Angeles